Cornerstone University is a private Christian university in Grand Rapids, Michigan.

Cornerstone University has undergraduate and graduate programs, two seminaries (Grand Rapids Theological Seminary and Asia Biblical Theological Seminary based in Chiang Mai, Thailand), and a radio division called Cornerstone University Radio (WCSG, Mission Network News). The university offers 60 academic programs in the arts, sciences, humanities, Bible, teacher education, computers and business and journalism. The university maintains Mission Network News (MNN), an evangelical "broadcast ministry". Students are required to abide by a "Lifestyle Statement" intended to reflect trinitarianism.  Cornerstone had an enrollment of 1,998 students, including professional and graduate studies and both seminaries. 

The university is accredited by the Higher Learning Commission, the Association of Theological Schools in the United States and Canada, and the National Association of Schools of Music. Cornerstone's social work program is accredited by the Council on Social Work Education.

History
Cornerstone was founded in 1941 as the Baptist Bible Institute by the General Association of Regular Baptist Churches as an evening school.  The first class graduated in 1944 and the first degree was conferred in 1947. It was accredited in 1963 as a four-year degree-granting college and renamed the Grand Rapids Baptist Bible College and Seminary. WCSG began broadcasting in June 1973 with an easy listening and fine arts format. In 1993, it absorbed the Grand Rapids School of Bible and Music.

On July 1, 1999, following approval by the State of Michigan, Cornerstone College and Grand Rapids Baptist Seminary became Cornerstone University. In June 2003, the graduate theological school became Grand Rapids Theological Seminary.

In the 1990s and early 2000s Cornerstone University expanded and transformed, changing its name, becoming a university, increasing enrollment, adding facilities and improving the campus, introducing an adult program including the MBA and a leadership development experience, adding an Honors Program and "Civitas" Core Curriculum, changing its mascot, colors, and logo.

Presidents
 David Otis Fuller (1941–1944)
 Norman F. Douty (1944–1945)
 Paul Jackson (1945–1946) (acting president)
 Gerard Knol (1946–1953)
 Leon J. Wood (1953–1954) (acting president)
 J. Edward Hakes (1954–1958)
 Howard A. Keithley (1958–1959) (acting president)
 W. Wilbert Welch (1959–1983) (Chancellor: 1983–2015)
 Charles U. Wagner (1983–1990)
 W. Wilbert Welch (1991) (interim president)
 Rex M. Rogers (1991–2008)
 Joseph M. Stowell, III (2008–2021)
 Gerson Moreno-Riaño (2021–)

Campus

On Saturday, October 7, 2006, the W. Wilbert and Meryl Welch Tower was dedicated during Cornerstone's 2006 Homecoming. The clock tower has a four faced clock near its top. The clock tower is located between the Gainey Conference Center and Bolthouse Hall on campus.

Athletics
The Cornerstone athletic teams are called the Golden Eagles. The university is a member of the National Association of Intercollegiate Athletics (NAIA), primarily competing in the Wolverine–Hoosier Athletic Conference (WHAC) since the 1992–93 academic year.

Cornerstone completes in 20 intercollegiate varsity sports: Men's sports include baseball, basketball, bowling, cross country, golf, soccer, tennis, track & field, volleyball and wrestling; while women's sports include basketball, bowling, cheerleading, cross country, golf, soccer, softball, tennis, track & field and volleyball.

Mascot
The official mascot is Rocky the Golden Eagle. The baseball team's honorary mascot is Buster the Bulldog.

Accomplishments
Cornerstone has won the NAIA Men's Basketball Championships (Division II) in 1999, 2011 and 2015.

Notable alumni
 Stephen Herdsman, soccer player
 Lisa Kelly, trucker
 Reid Ribble, politician who was a U.S. congressional Representative
 Derek Scott, distance runner and coach

References

External links
 
 Official athletics website

 
Nondenominational Christian universities and colleges
Cornerstone
Educational institutions established in 1941
Universities and colleges in Kent County, Michigan
Council for Christian Colleges and Universities
1941 establishments in Michigan